Schaw may refer to:

Clan Schaw, a Scottish clan.
William Schaw, (c. 1550 – 1602), Scottish, Master of Works to James VI, was an important figure in the development of freemasonry.